The Count of Monte Cristo (Spanish: El Conde de Montecristo) is a 1953 Argentine-Mexican historical adventure film directed by León Klimovsky and starring Jorge Mistral, Elina Colomer and Santiago Gómez Cou. It is an adaptation of Alexandre Dumas's 1844 novel The Count of Monte Cristo.

Cast
 Jorge Mistral as Edmundo Dantés / Conde de Montecristo  
 Elina Colomer as Haydee 
 Santiago Gómez Cou as Villefort  
 Nelly Meden as Mercedes 
 Ariel Absalón 
 Ricardo Argemí 
 Francisco Audenino 
 Fina Basser
 Ernesto Bianco as Fernando Mondego  
 Margot Cottens 
 José De Angelis 
 Josefa Goldar 
 Francisco López Silva as Abate Faria  
 Federico Mansilla 
 Nathán Pinzón as Danglars  
 Ángel Prio 
 Daniel Tedeschi

External links
 

1953 films
1950s historical adventure films
Argentine historical adventure films
Mexican historical adventure films
1950s Spanish-language films
Argentine black-and-white films
Films directed by León Klimovsky
Films set in the 19th century
Mexican black-and-white films
1950s Argentine films
1950s Mexican films